The Collaboration is a play written by Anthony McCarten and directed by Kwame Kwei-Armah. The play originated on the West End at The Young Vic in London. The play stars Paul Bettany as Andy Warhol and Jeremy Pope as Jean-Michel Basquiat. The story, set in New York in 1984, centers around the collaboration between Andy Warhol and Jean-Michel Basquiat and their new exhibition. The production will make its Broadway transfer at the Samuel J. Friedman Theatre in co-production with the Manhattan Theatre Club and the Young Vic Theatre. The production will begin in the fall of 2022 with performances starting November 29.

Background 
The play was written by British playwright Anthony McCarten and directed by Kwame Kwei-Armah. It is the second of what McCarten calls his “Worship Trilogy,” works that explore the collective fascination with religion, art and money. The first in the installment was his 2019 film The Two Popes starring Anthony Hopkins and Jonathan Pryce as Pope Benedict XVI and Pope Francis. The final installment of the "Worship Trilogy" is Wednesday at Warren's, Friday at Bill's, the upcoming McCarten-scripted adaptation about the meetings between Warren Buffett and Bill Gates that led to the establishment of The Giving Pledge, which encourages extraordinarily wealthy people to give their fortunes to philanthropic causes.

Plot summary 
The show revolves around painter and artist Andy Warhol, whose career is falling, and his relationship with up and coming artist Jean-Michel Basquiat. Together they agree to collaborate on a new art exhibit.

Cast

Productions

2022 West End 
The play originated in the West End written by Anthony McCarten and directed by Kwame Kwei-Armah; the production opened in previews at the Young Vic in London in February 2022 and ended its run in April.

2022 Broadway 
It was announced that the production will make its New York stage debut on Broadway by the Manhattan Theatre Club. This production will be directed by Kwei-Armah and Bettany and Pope will reprise their roles at the Samuel J. Friedman Theater with previews beginning November 29, 2022 and an opening night scheduled for December 20.

Film adaptation 
In 2022, it was announced that the play will be adapted into a movie of the same name with Bettany and Pope reprising their roles. Kwei-Armah is set to make his directorial film debut.

Critical reception 
Critical reception for the play has been mixed with praise mostly being focused on the leading performance of Bettany and Pope as Warhol and Basquiat respectively. Time Out declared the play, "It is, as I say, terrific entertainment. But there's no getting away from the fact that it's wildly contrived". Critic Arifa Akbar of The Guardian praised the performances writing, "Bettany and Pope do so much more than merely ventriloquising their celebrity parts. Bettany captures Warhol's tics – his gawkiness and gormless stares with a deadpan streak of cynicism...Pope gives us a seductive, childlike free spirit in his Basquiat". The Evening Standards critic Nick Curtis praised the performances describing them as "devastating", "triumphant", and "gorgeous", adding, "McCarten...gives them plenty of big themes – art, commerce, identity, faith, death – to chew on."

References 

2022 plays
Works set in the 1980s